Partial general elections were held in Belgium on 11 June 1861. In the elections for the Chamber of Representatives the result was a victory for the Liberal Party, which won 66 of the 116 seats. Voter turnout was 58.4%, although only 47,555 people were eligible to vote.

Under the alternating system, elections for the Chamber of Representatives were only held in four out of the nine provinces: Hainaut, Limburg, Liège and East Flanders.

Results

Chamber of Representatives

References

1860s elections in Belgium
General
Belgium
Belgium